Hibbertia goyderi is a species of flowering plant in the family Dilleniaceae and is endemic to the Northern Territory. It is a small leafless shrub with angular stems and yellow flowers with about nine or ten stamens arranged around the two carpels.

Description
There are about nine or ten stamens arranged around the two carpels. Flowering occurs from August to March.

Taxonomy
Hibbertia goyderi was first formally described in 1871 by Ferdinand von Mueller in Fragmenta phytographiae Australiae from specimens collected by "Schultz" near Port Darwin. The specific epithet (goyderi) honours George Goyder.

Distribution and habitat
This hibbertia grows in woodland near Darwin in the far north-east of the Northern Territory.

See also
List of Hibbertia species

References

goyderi
Flora of the Northern Territory
Plants described in 1871
Taxa named by Ferdinand von Mueller